Clapp Raymond (June 20, 1732 – 1795) was a member of the Connecticut House of Representatives from Norwalk in the sessions of May and October 1778, October 1779, and October 1783.

Early life
He was born June 20, 1732.

In February 1775, he was appointed to a committee for the inspection of fire-arms. In 1780 was on a committee constituted by the Legislature to run a line for the boundary of a religious society.

Family life
He married Rebecca Betts on August 4, 1757. He had four children: Rebecca, Hannah, Asahel, and Clapp.

Death
Clapp Raymond died in 1795 in Ballston Spa, New York, and was buried in there.

See also 
 Sloan-Raymond-Fitch House

References 

1732 births
1795 deaths
Connecticut militiamen in the American Revolution
Members of the Connecticut House of Representatives
Politicians from Norwalk, Connecticut
Military personnel from Connecticut
18th-century American politicians